"Give Me A Try" is a song by British indie band The Wombats. It was the third single to be released from their third album Glitterbug. The song premiered as Zane Lowe's Hottest Record in the World on Radio 1 on March 3, 2015.

Track listing

Critical reception
IndieLondon gave the song a positive review, saying:

"It’s a song brimming with hope and positivity, and finds Murph’s vocals in soaring form, while echoed electronic arrangements and wall of noise guitars reverberate in the background. It all adds up to create a thrilling whole and is another rip-roaring example of why Glitterbug is now keenly anticipated."

Charts

References

2015 singles
The Wombats songs
2015 songs
14th Floor Records singles
Songs written by Matthew Murphy
Songs written by Tord Øverland Knudsen
Songs written by Dan Haggis